Smena-Zenit may refer to:
FC Smena-Zenit Saint Petersburg, an FC Zenit farm club dissolved in 2009
DYuSSh Smena-Zenit, an FC Zenit youth academy